Philip Lader, is a former US Ambassador to the Court of St. James’s and former Chairman of WPP plc, the global  advertising/communications services firm (including Ogilvy & Mather, J. Walter Thompson, Young & Rubicam, Grey, Hill & Knowlton, Burson-Marsteller, Kantar, and Group M, with 205,000 people in 112 countries).

As a senior adviser to Morgan Stanley, he serves on several of its investment committees and boards of its private equity portfolio companies in addition to investment banking responsibilities. He is also a retired partner in the Nelson Mullins law firm.

In government, he also served as a member of President Clinton’s Cabinet as Administrator of the US Small Business Administration, Assistant to the President, White House Deputy Chief of Staff, and deputy director of the US Office of Management and Budget.

Ambassador Lader serves, or has served, on the boards of RAND Corporation (formerly Vice Chairman),  Lloyd's of London, Marathon Oil,  AMC Entertainment, AES Corporation, UC Rusal, Songbird (Canary Wharf), Duck Creek Technologies, and Minerva Corporations, the British Museum, American Red Cross, the Smithsonian Museum of American History, St. Paul's Cathedral Foundation, Atlantic Council,  and Bankinter Foundation for Innovation.

He is a member of the Council on Foreign Relations, an Honorary Fellow of London Business School and Oxford University's Pembroke College, and an Honorary Bencher of the Middle Temple (British Inns of Court).

In 1981, he and his wife, Linda LeSourd Lader, founded Renaissance Weekends, the non-partisan retreats that seek to build bridges between innovative leaders from diverse fields. They continue to host five Renaissance Weekends each year around the U.S.

Early life and education
Lader graduated Phi Beta Kappa with a Bachelor of Arts in political science from Duke University in 1966, received the Master of Arts in History from the University of Michigan in 1967, completed graduate studies in law and English constitutional history at Oxford University from 1967 to 1968, and received his JD as a Leopold Schepp Scholar from Harvard Law School in 1972.

Career
During his studies at Harvard Law School, Lader was an Assistant Professor of Political Science at Newton College of the Sacred Heart (subsequently merged with Boston College) and a teaching assistant to Harvard Law Professor Paul Freund and Harvard Political Philosophy Professor Louis Hartz. After graduation, he was a law clerk to the late Judge Paul Roney, Chief Judge of the U.S. Court of Appeals for the 11th Circuit (formerly Fifth Circuit) and was associated with the New York law firm of Sullivan & Cromwell. He served in the U.S. Army (JAG) Reserves from 1969 to 1975.

Lader was president of Sea Pines Company, a developer/operator of large-scale recreation communities including Hilton Head Island, Amelia Island,  and Kiawah Island. Upon sale of that company in 1983, he was president of Winthrop University in Rock Hill, South Carolina, which was awarded the National Gold Medal for "general improvement in programs" by the Council for Advancement & Support of Education during his tenure, and served until becoming a candidate in the 1986 South Carolina gubernatorial election, finishing second to then-Lieutenant Governor Michael R. Daniel and foregoing the run-off in support of Daniel, who narrowly lost to Republican Carroll A. Campbell Jr. in the general election.

From 1986 to 1989, Lader was Executive Vice President of Sir James Goldsmith's U.S. holdings – which included America's then-largest private landholdings, sixth-largest forest products company, largest computer supplies supplier, and oil and gas interests. After the assets' restructuring and sale, he was president and Vice-Chancellor of Bond University, Australia's first private university.

Under President Bill Clinton, described by The New York Times as "a longtime friend," Lader was confirmed unanimously three times by the U.S. Senate for his State Department, SBA and OMB roles.  Returning to the private sector in 2001, Lader joined Morgan Stanley and WPP.  In addition to board services, he also was the John West Professor of International Studies at The Citadel, The Military College of South Carolina from 2001 to 2006.

He has served as president of Business Executives for National Security, chairman of the Board of Visitors of Duke University’s Sanford Institute of Public Policy and the Royal Academy of Arts American Trust, a member of Harvard Law School's Visiting Committee, Columbia University's International Advisory Board, Yale Divinity School's advisory board, and Brown University's  Watson Institute for International and Public Affairs Advisory Board, and the founding Council of the Rothermere American Institute at Oxford University. In South Carolina, he was a trustee of Middleton Place Foundation (America's oldest landscaped gardens) and Liberty Fellows and was chairman of the South Carolina Small & Minority Business Council, a trustee of South Carolina State Colleges, and a director of the South Carolina Jobs-Economic Development Authority, First Carolina Bank, and the South Carolina Chamber of Commerce.

Honors 
Lader has been awarded honorary doctorates by 14 universities. For his contributions to trans-Atlantic relations, the Royal Society for the Arts, Manufactures and Commerce awarded him the 2001 Benjamin Franklin Medal, and he received the Rotary International Foundation's 2007 Global Service to Humanity Award and British-American Business' 2016 Founders Award.

Personal life 
He is married to Linda LeSourd Lader, who is Associate Pastor of Gardens Presbyterian Church in Palm Beach Gardens, Florida.  A graduate of Yale Divinity School and fifth-generation graduate of Ohio Wesleyan University, she was Associate Pastor of the New York Avenue Presbyterian Church in Washington, D.C.  Her editing work continued the tradition of her parents, Leonard LeSourd, longtime editor of Guideposts Magazine and Catherine Marshall, author of A Man Called Peter, Christy, and other best-selling books. She received the International Women’s Foundation Leadership Award in 2000 and the 2012 Humanitarian Award from Emma Willard School, her alma mater.

Ambassador and Mrs. Lader have two daughters.  Mary-Catherine Lader, who holds  JD/MBA degrees from Harvard University, is Chief Operating Officer of the decentralized finance platform Uniswap and previously was a managing director at BlackRock (and Chief Operating Officer of the firm's Digital Wealth business and head of its climate tech business, Aladdin Sustainability).  Whitaker Lader, who holds the MBA from Stanford University and leads actor Nicholas Hoult's film/TV production company, previously worked with Ron Howard's and Brian Grazer's Imagine Entertainment and Sundance Institute; and her credits include "The World to Come" (starring Vanessa Kirby and Katherine Waterstone) and "Light of My Life" (Casey Affleck and Elisabeth Moss).  Both daughters are also graduates of Brown University.

References

External links
 Council of American Ambassadors biography
 Nelson Mullins law firm biography
 Renaissance Weekend - Founders
 

|-

1946 births
Living people
20th-century American diplomats
20th-century American politicians
21st-century American diplomats
Administrators of the Small Business Administration
Alumni of Pembroke College, Oxford
Ambassadors of the United States to the United Kingdom
Atlantic Council
Candidates in the 1986 United States elections
Clinton administration cabinet members
Bond University Vice-Chancellors
Deputy Directors for Management of the Office of Management and Budget
Duke University Trinity College of Arts and Sciences alumni
Harvard Law School alumni
Politicians from Charleston, South Carolina
Politicians from New York City
South Carolina Democrats
Sullivan & Cromwell people
The Citadel, The Military College of South Carolina faculty
University of Michigan alumni
White House Deputy Chiefs of Staff
Winthrop University people
WPP plc people
Newton College of the Sacred Heart faculty